Shell Lake is a lake in the Canadian province of Saskatchewan. It is a small lake east of Chitek Lake in the Beaver River drainage basin. The primary inflow comes from Lac Huard, which is to the south. From the northern end of the lake, Tea Creek flows out and to the north. Tea Creek is joined by several smaller creeks en route to the northern end of Green Lake. Green River flows out of the northern end of Green Lake and into Beaver River.

Shell Lake Recreation Site 
Shell Lake Recreation Site is a provincial recreation site on the western shore of Shell Lake. The park features a small campground and a boat launch for fishing. Northern pike and perch are fish commonly found in the lake. Access to the park is from Highway 945.

See also 
List of lakes of Saskatchewan
Tourism in Saskatchewan

References 

Lakes of Saskatchewan
Big River No. 555, Saskatchewan